Nicola Spirig Hug (born 7 February 1982) is a Swiss lawyer and former professional triathlete. She is the 2012 Olympic and six times European champion in women's triathlon.

Career
Nicola Spirig is a five times Olympian. She was Olympic champion in 2012 and runner up in 2016.  She was World Championship runner up in 2010, Junior World Champion in 2001, Junior European Champion in 1999, and Elite European Champion in 2009, 2010, 2012, 2014, 2015 and 2018.  She was the second oldest competitor in the field when she won the 2018 European Championships in Glasgow.

Spirig was born in Winkel. On 4 August 2012, Spirig won Gold in the Olympic Women's Triathlon, winning a close race in a photo finish with Sweden's Lisa Nordén.

In the 13 years from 1998 to 2010, Spirig took part in 72 ITU competitions and achieved 39 top ten positions. In 2010, she won the European Championships and the World Championship Series triathlon in Madrid, and the silver medal at the World Championship Series triathlon in London. In the overall World Championship Series ranking she place second.

Spirig has also competed as a long-distance runner, finishing second at the Swiss Cross-Country Championships in 2014 and competing at the 2014 Zurich Marathon. She subsequently competed in the marathon at the 2014 European Athletics Championships in Zurich, where she finished 24th in a time of 2:37.12. More recently she finished second in the 10,000 metres at the Swiss National Athletics Championships in 2021. In 2015, she and heptathlete Linda Züblin competed at the St. Moritz track in a round of the Bobsleigh World Cup, racing at the invitation of Swiss pilot Beat Hefti alongside him and brakeman Alex Baumann in the four man event, with the quartet placing 27th.

In 2021, she competed in the women's event at the 2020 Summer Olympics in Tokyo, Japan. She also competed in the mixed relay event.

Personal life

Nicola Spirig lives in Bachenbülach and holds a degree in law (lic.iur.). Both her elder sister and her elder brother were high-performance athletes before they started their academic careers. Their parents are teachers of physical education. Spirig is married to former Swiss triathlete Reto Hug. They have a son, born 2013 and a daughter, born 2017. When 2012 Olympic champion Nicola Spirig had her first child, she was not sure whether she would ever return to triathlon. But just 12 weeks after her third child was born in April 2019, the 37-year-old was back competing in the World Triathlon Series Grand Final held in Lausanne, Switzerland between 30 August 2019 to 1 September 2019.

ITU competitions 
The following lists are based upon the official ITU rankings and the athlete's Profile Page. Unless indicated otherwise, the following events are triathlons and belong to the Elite category.

Olympics

World Championships

World Cups

European Championships

European Games

European Cups

Junior results

Awards
 2000 Best Swiss Junior Sportswoman award
 2001 Swiss Newcomer of the Year
 2012 Swiss Sports Personality of the Year
 2015 European Triathlon Union Female Athlete of the Year

References

Further reading 
  Part 2 The story of how Spirig trained for, and won, her 2012 London Olympic title.

External links 

 
 Profile at triathlon.org
 Archived profile at triathlon.org

1982 births
Living people
Olympic triathletes of Switzerland
Olympic gold medalists for Switzerland
Olympic medalists in triathlon
People from Bülach
Swiss female triathletes
Triathletes at the 2004 Summer Olympics
Triathletes at the 2008 Summer Olympics
Triathletes at the 2012 Summer Olympics
Triathletes at the 2016 Summer Olympics
Medalists at the 2012 Summer Olympics
Swiss female marathon runners
European Games gold medalists for Switzerland
European Games medalists in triathlon
Triathletes at the 2015 European Games
Medalists at the 2016 Summer Olympics
20th-century Swiss women
21st-century Swiss women
Olympic silver medalists for Switzerland
21st-century women lawyers
Triathletes at the 2020 Summer Olympics
Sportspeople from the canton of Zürich